Eugène Ruffy (2 August 1854, in Lutry – 25 October 1919) was a Swiss politician.

He was elected to the Swiss Federal Council on 14 December 1893 and resigned on 31 October 1899. He was affiliated with the Free Democratic Party of Switzerland. 

During his time in office he headed the following departments:
 Department of Justice and Police (1894)
 Department of Home Affairs (1895)
 Department of Justice and Police (1895)
 Department of Home Affairs (1896–1897)
 Political Department (1898)
 Military Department (1899)
He was President of the Confederation in 1898.

His father, Victor Ruffy (1823-1869), was a member of the Federal Council in 1868/1869. The younger Ruffy was the only person to succeed his father as a member of the council until the election of Eveline Widmer-Schlumpf in 2007.

External links

1854 births
1919 deaths
People from Lavaux-Oron District
Swiss Calvinist and Reformed Christians
Free Democratic Party of Switzerland politicians
Foreign ministers of Switzerland
Members of the Federal Council (Switzerland)
Members of the National Council (Switzerland)
Presidents of the National Council (Switzerland)
University of Lausanne alumni